Motu Kō is one of three islands in the Pukapuka atoll of the Cook Islands. It forms the southern apex of Pukapuka's triangular atoll, 10km south of Wale, and is the largest of the three islands. The island is low-lying, with a maximum elevation of 5m above sea level and most of it only one or two metres. It is uninhabited and used as a food source, regulated by the village of Ngake. 

Pukapuka Island Airfield is located on Motu Kō.

References

Pukapuka